Brandon Stephens (born December 14, 1987) is an American football cornerback who is currently a free agent. He played college football at Miami University. He has been a member of the Cleveland Gladiators, Baltimore Brigade, and Albany Empire.

References

Living people
1987 births
Miami RedHawks football players
Cleveland Gladiators players
Baltimore Brigade players
Albany Empire (AFL) players
People from Strongsville, Ohio
Players of American football from Ohio
Sportspeople from Cuyahoga County, Ohio
American football defensive backs
Columbus Destroyers players